The 31st Golden Raspberry Awards, or Razzies, was a parodic award ceremony that was held on February 26, 2011, at the Barnsdall Gallery Theatre in Hollywood, California to honor the worst films the film industry had to offer in 2010. The nominations were announced on January 24. Per Razzies tradition, both the nominee announcements and ceremony preceded the corresponding Academy Awards functions by one day. The Last Airbender was the big winner of 2010, with five awards, including Worst Picture.

Winners and nominees

Films with multiple nominations and wins 
These films received multiple nominations:

These films won multiple awards:

See also
 83rd Academy Awards

References

Razzie Awards
2011 in American cinema
Golden Raspberry Awards ceremonies
Razzie Awards
February 2011 events in the United States
Golden Raspberry